Rotary Park Bridge is a historic arch bridge located in Rotary Park at Huntington, Cabell County, West Virginia, United States. It was built in 1929-1930 and is constructed of native rock-faced, square-cut ashlar in a rustic style. It is approximately 175 feet long and 30 feet wide.

It was listed on the National Register of Historic Places in 2002.

References

Road bridges on the National Register of Historic Places in West Virginia
Bridges completed in 1930
Buildings and structures in Huntington, West Virginia
National Register of Historic Places in Cabell County, West Virginia
Rustic architecture in West Virginia
Stone arch bridges in the United States